Deo also known as "Dev", is a city council, town and a notified area in Aurangabad district in the Indian state of Bihar. Deo is located 10 km to the southeast of District Administrative Aurangabad Bihar.

Geography
Deo is located at  It has an average elevation of 89 metres (291 feet).

Demographics
 India census, Deo had a population of 173,216. Males constitute 89,280 of the population and females 83,936. Deo has an average literacy rate of 89%, more than the national average of 59.5%: male literacy is 75%, and female literacy is 61%. In Deo, 29% of the population is under 6 years of age. Total number of households was 27,596.

Transportation
Deo has a road network providing connectivity with the state of Bihar and other parts of the country. The Grand Trunk Road from Kolkata to Delhi passes some 4 km from Deo. This road is known as National Highway 19 (before 2010, National Highway 2)

Educational institutions
 Raja Jagannath High School, Deo
 Rani Brajraj Kumari Project High School, Deo

Notable people
 Rajan Singh former member of the Bihar Legislative Council

See also
 Deo Sun Temple
 Deo Fort
 Deo Raj

References

 
Cities and towns in Aurangabad district, Bihar
Articles containing potentially dated statements from 2001
All articles containing potentially dated statements
Hindu pilgrimage sites in India
Hindu holy cities
Religious tourism in India
Tourist attractions in Bihar